Pincerna is a genus of air-breathing land snails in the family Alycaeidae.

Species
 Pincerna anceyi (J. Mabille, 1887)
 Pincerna bembex (Benson, 1859)
 Pincerna burrailensis (Godwin-Austen, 1914)
 Pincerna constricta (Benson, 1851)
 Pincerna costata (Godwin-Austen, 1914)
 Pincerna costulosa (Bavay & Dautzenberg, 1912)
 Pincerna crenilabris (Möllendorff, 1897)
 Pincerna difficilis (Godwin-Austen, 1914)
 Pincerna elegans (Godwin-Austen, 1914)
 Pincerna globosa (H. Adams, 1871)
 Pincerna granum (Godwin-Austen, 1893)
 Pincerna graphiaria (Godwin-Austen, 1914)
 Pincerna graphica (W. T. Blanford, 1862)
 Pincerna khunhoensis (Godwin-Austen, 1914)
 Pincerna liratula (Preston, 1907)
 Pincerna major (Godwin-Austen, 1893)
 Pincerna maolanensis (T.-C. Luo, W.-H. Zhang & W.-C. Zhou, 2009)
 Pincerna margarita (Theobald, 1874)
 Pincerna mouhoti (L. Pfeiffer, 1863)
 Pincerna multicostulata (Godwin-Austen, 1914)
 Pincerna otiphorus (Benson, 1859)
 Pincerna paucicostata (Godwin-Austen, 1914)
 Pincerna summa (Godwin-Austen, 1914)
 Pincerna tenella (Godwin-Austen, 1914)
 Pincerna thieroti (de Morgan, 1885)
 Pincerna thompsoni (Godwin-Austen, 1914)
 Pincerna vallis Z.-Y. Chen & M. Wu, 2020
 Pincerna vanbuensis (Bavay & Dautzenberg, 1900)
 Pincerna yanseni Páll-Gergely, 2017

References

External links
  Preston, H. B. (1907). Description of a new subgenus and species of Alycaeus from Ke-Lan-Tan. Proceedings of the Malacological Society of London. 7: 206
 Godwin-Austen, H. H. (1882-1920). Land and freshwater Mollusca of India, including South Arabia, Baluchistan, Afghanistan, Kashmir, Nepal, Burmah, Pegu, Tenasserim, Malay Peninsula, Ceylon, and other islands of the Indian Ocean. Supplementary to Messrs. Theobald and Hanley's Conchologia Indica. London, Taylor & Francis
 Páll-Gergely, B., Sajan, S., Tripathy, B., Meng, K., Asami, T. & Ablett, J.D. (2020). Genus-level revision of the Alycaeidae (Gastropoda: Cyclophoroidea), with an annotated species catalog. ZooKeys. 981: 1–220

Alycaeidae